International Management Institute (IMI) Kolkata is a private business school located in Kolkata, India. It laid its foundation in 2010. The Institute started functioning in the year 2011 with its flagship Post Graduate Diploma in Management Programme accredited by the National Board of Accreditation (NBA).  In 2017, the Institute of six years also obtained the approval from All India Council for Technical Education to launch the Fellow Programme in Management (FPM), a Ph.D.  level programme. IMI Kolkata's two-year full time PGDM programme is also accorded equivalence with Master of Business Administration (MBA) Degree by the Association of Indian Universities(AIU). The first fresh batch of students at IMI Kolkata graduated in the year 2013. Campus placements at IMI Kolkata shot up in the year 2014 with hundred percent of the students securing placements at some of the most renowned organizations like Deloitte, JSW Group, CESC Limited, ICICI Bank, PwC, KPMG, Yes Bank, Tech Mahindra, Xiaomi, Amazon, Flipkart and several others.

History
IMI Kolkata belongs to the IMI family of B-Schools in India. IMI came up with its first campus at New Delhi in the year 1981. IMI New Delhi was established in collaboration with IMI Geneva (now IMD Lausanne) and carries the title of being the first corporate sponsored B-school in India. During its inception, the institute was backed by the support of big corporate houses such as RPG Enterprises, Nestle, ITC, SAIL, Tata Chemicals, BOC and Williamson Magor. It was in 2010 that the RP-Sanjiv Goenka group decided to expand and start two more campuses in Kolkata and Bhubaneswar

Academics

Ranking

In 2020, IMI Kolkata was ranked 52nd among management institutes in India by the National Institutional Ranking Framework (NIRF). IMI Kolkata is also a part of Study in India programme, under Ministry of Human Resource Development, Government of India.

International collaborations and partnerships
In 2011, in order to facilitate joint research in retail and other areas, IMI entered into an agreement with the Oxford Institute of Retail Management (OXIRM). The basic objective of the research programme was to influence public policy decision makers on retail development issues and retail practitioners through data-driven retail and consumer-related research outputs among others.
Subsequently, the Institute signed a Memorandum of Understanding (MoU) with various eminent institutes/universities on the global front. The agreements are aimed at mutual support, confluence of ideas, knowledge sharing, joint research and consultancy as well as scholarly exchanges that encompass faculty and student exchange programmes. The collaborating partners include: 
ESC Rennes School of Business(France)
Sichuan University(China)
Sichuan Academy of Social Sciences(China)
Kunming University of Science and Technology (KUST), China
IAE University of Tours (France)
North South University  (Bangladesh)
Universidade do Estado Rio de Janeiro/Rio de Janeiro State University (Brazil)
IDRAC Business School (France)
Emporia State University(USA)

Academic programmes 
IMI Kolkata offers a two-year full-time Post Graduate Diploma in Management (PGDM). The criteria for selection to the academic program is based on the Common Admission Test (CAT), the Xavier Aptitude Test (XAT) score of the candidates applying to the course. In June 2017, IMI Kolkata introduced its doctoral level programme for the first time called Fellow Programme in Management (FPM) to encourage scholars and support their efforts to become researchers and academicians in various fields of Management. For Session, 2021, the college has also decided to accept candidates with Management Aptitude Test (MAT) scores, keeping the COVID-19 situation in mind.

In-house publication
IMI Konnect is a bi-monthly open access scholarly management publication of IMI Kolkata that started its journey in December 2012. It caters to academicians and practitioners in corporate and government organizations and departments. It publishes original research articles by scholars in the field of management and firsthand perspectives from business thinkers and practitioners on contemporary issues. Interviews with eminent personalities in the field of business are also published. It provides an opportunity to scholars across the world to debate and discuss their opinions over this intellectual platform.It caters to academicians and practitioners in corporate and government organizations and departments.

Academic Journals
 Journal of Operations and Strategic Planning through Sage Publications. JOSP is a bi annual international journal designed to inform and shape academic discussions around empirical and theoretical facets of Operations Management. 
 Studies in Microeconomics through Sage Publications. Studies in Microeconomics (MIC) is a Scopus, RePEc, ProQuest, ICI, EconLit listed international (Sage) journal, publishing high quality, analytically rigorous papers in the areas of Microeconomics .

Organisation and administration

Centres of Excellence
IMI-Kolkata has four Centres of Excellence aimed at fulfilling the gap of research, engagement and capacity building in the areas of Financial Markets, Retail, Corporate Governance and Social Responsibility, Asian Studies and Consumer Studies.
Centre for Retail Management (CRM)- The centre focuses on addressing emerging needs in the retail sector, including capacity building, policy decisions on developmental issues, research in critical retailing practices, global research on the emerging markets and research in consumer behavior. International Marketing Conference on ‘Emerging Markets, Evolving Perspectives’ from December 16 to 17, 2014 was hosted by IMI Kolkata.
Centre for Financial Market Studies (CFMS)-The CFMS focuses on training, research and consultancy in areas related to banking and financial sector, with emphasis on meaningful research on research in the financial sector in relation to the macroeconomic environment, policy prescriptions for policymakers on the basis of research, building competency of the executives working with banks and other financial institutions in areas like risk analysis, business forecasting and many more.  IMI Kolkata published working paper on “How Well Are the Banks Managing Their NPAs? A Comparative Analysis” by Paramita Mukherjee.
Centre for Corporate Governance and Social Responsibility (CCGSR)- The centre was established to serve the increasing requirement for training, research and consultancy in corporate governance. The CCGSR focuses on the application of corporate governance policies and mechanisms for practising managers, understanding reporting mechanisms in the context of corporate governance and benchmarking of global good practices in corporate governance. National Foundation for Corporate Governance with IMI Kolkata is working on Project on ‘Exploring linkages between Gender Diversity and Corporate Governance: Do Women Directorships really add to Business Value?’ IMI Kolkata is also working on ‘Exploring Relationships between Corporate Governance Practices and Financial Performance of Firms in India : Does more focus on governance create increased business value?’ sponsored by Ministry of Corporate Affairs, Government of India. IMI Kolkata is accredited as National Centre for Corporate Governance. by National Foundation of Corporate Governance (NFCG). 
 Centre for Asian Studies (CAS)- The centre works on developing knowledge through original research, disseminating knowledge through use of Asian materials and innovative pedagogy, carrying out research on the infrastructure sector, including its regulations and developing and leverage international collaborations through studies having high policy impact.In 2016, Professor Paramita Mukherjee from IMI Kolkata, Arnab Deb from International Management Institute, New Delhi and Miao Pang from Sichuan Academy of Social Sciences published "China and India: History, Culture, Cooperation, Competition” by SAGE Publishing. IMI Kolkata in Collaboration with Asia Pacific Economic Association. have organised annual conferences over the last few years. IMI Kolkata has organised the Fifteenth Annual Conference (2019) at Fukuoka University, Fukuoka, Japan, the Fourteenth Annual Conference(2018) in University of Southern California, Los Angeles, United States, the Thirteenth Annual Conference(2017) in Korea University, Seoul, Korea, the Twelfth Annual Conference(2016) in IMI Kolkata campus and the Eleventh Annual Conference of the Association(2015) in National Taiwan University. IMI Kolkata in association with Sichuan Academy of Social Sciences, has also organised joint Indo-China conferences, on topics relevant to both the economies. The conferences are held every year in either of the two campuses. IMI Kolkata partnered with Global Development Network, which began as a unit of the World Bank in agreement with BIDS, to organise a conference on 'Science Technology and Innovation for Development' in 2018.

Directors of IMI Kolkata
 2011-2012- Professor Ashish K Bhattacharya, Former professor of Indian Institute of Management Calcutta
 2012-2013- Professor Ahindra Chakrabarti, Professor, Greatlakes Institute of Management, Gurgaon
 2013-2014- Interim Director, Professor Tirthankar Nag, Dean, Research and International Relations, IMI Kolkata 
2014-2020- Professor Arindam Banik, Associated Cement Companies Chair Professor in International Business and Finance at IMI
 October 2020 onwards- Professor Mohua Banerjee, IMI Kolkata

Infrastructure
IMI Kolkata boasts of its state-of-the-art infrastructure. The campus building is separated into an academic block and a residential block. Developed and designed by Abin Design Studio the decorative pattern of the building is inspired by nature There are single occupancy fully furnished hostel rooms for the students within the campus for both boys and girls along with mess facility available adjacent to the hostel. 
There is a common room for indoor games and the students also have access to the gymnasium. The entire campus is Wi-fi enabled with LAN connectivity thereby providing access to the internet to both the academic as well as the residential block. Classroom lectures are updated with the latest audio-visual equipment.

Architecture 
Consisting of 11,000 square meters, this unique building is the first of its kind to be built in India with its colored façade and unmistakable identity. Designed by architect Abin Chaudhuri, the concept was to insert a burst of color in the city's monotonous dense urban fabric, representing the colors of the sky. To achieve the colors in the glass facade, Vanceva PBB has been used as the sandwich material between two layers of glass. The colored laminate on the façade follows no repetitive pattern and is symbolic of the unpredictable nature of the sky. It also represents the vibrancy of today's youth. An integrated plaza with a water body has been designed. The water body receives no direct sunlight and creates a comfortable micro-climate. Wherever possible shading trees have been planted on the hard landscape and soft landscape has been introduced.

Student life

Events
Apart from seminar, workshops, conferences, Management Development Programmes (MDPs)  and Faculty Development Programmes conducted on a regular basis in the campus, IMI Kolkata hosts three annual events every year-
I-Konfluence - an undergraduate college fest
Confero - IMI Kolkata's annual fest
Converse- IMI Kolkata's annual management conclave

Convocation
Convocation at IMI Kolkata is a grand event. Since 2013, the management institute has had the honor of eminent personalities in its convocation ceremonies such as-
 Mr. Harshavardhan Neotia, Chairman, Ambuja Neotia Group. (2013)
 Mr. Rajat M. Nag, Distinguished Fellow, NCAER. (2014)
 Mr. Jawhar Sircar, Chairman, Prasar Bharati. (2015)
 Dr. Un-Chan Chung, Former Prime Minister, Republic of Korea. (2016)
 Mr. M.J. Akbar, Hon'ble Minister of State, Ministry of External Affairs, Government of India. (2017)
 Mr. Bibek Debroy, Chairman, Economic Advisory Council to the prime minister and Member of NITI Aayog. (2018)
 Mr. Sanjay Mitra, Indian Administrative Service Officer and Defence Secretary of India. (2019)

Research and consulting
According to Arindam Banik, Director of IMI Kolkata an international research focus is inextricably linked with effective management training. The objective is to support companies in a changing world by combining theoretical progress and their implications in business. The institute's faculty members are actively engaged with various research projects sponsored by globally recognized agencies and universities such as the National Foundation for Corporate Governance, Space Applications Centre (ISRO) CIMOn Aasia-ohjelmasta, BRICS (Rio de Janeiro), SASS South Asia Network of Economic Research Institutes (SANEI),), and Curtin University

External links

References

Business schools in Kolkata
Universities and colleges in Kolkata
Educational institutions established in 2010
2010 establishments in West Bengal
RPSG Group